The Municipal Commissioner of Ahmedabad is appointed by Gujarat Government to manage affairs of city of Ahmedabad. The terms of office is 3 years, which may be extended to further period of 3 years by government.

The Incumbent Municipal commissioner is Mr. Mukesh Kumar, IAS Officer.

List of Municipal Commissioners of Ahmedabad
{| class="wikitable"
|-
! Sr No !! Name !! From !! to
|-
| 1 || Mr. B P Patel || 1 July 1950 || 4 May 1954
|-
| 2 || Mr. M D Rajpal || 5 May 1954 || 4 May 1957
|-
| 3 || Mr. K M Kantawala || 5 May 1957 || 4 May 1960
|-
| 4 || Mr. F J Heredia || 5 May 1960 || 28 September 1961
|-
| 5 || Mr. M D Rajpal || 29 September 1961 || 23 May 1964
|-
| 6 || Mr. R M Desai || 24 May 1964 || 1 May 1965
|-
| 7 || Mr. S K Gangopadhyay || 2 May 1965 || 31 March 1966
|-
| 8 || Mr. H K L Capoor || 1 April 1966 || 31 August 1968
|-
| 9 || Mr. P B Mehta || 1 September 1968 || 15 April 1971
|-
| 10 || Mr. G N Dike || 16 April 1971 || 15 August 1973
|-
| 11 || Mr. S K Gangopadhyay || 16 August 1973 || 11 March 1974 
|-
| 12 || Mr. C C Doctor || 12 March 1974 || 1 September 1974
|-
| 13 || Mr. R R Basu || 2 September 1974 || 9 January 1976
|-
| 14 || Mr. R K Anklesaria || 10 January 1976 || 31 May 1979
|-
| 15 || Mr. V Krishnamurthy || 1 June 1979 || 14 September 1980
|-
| 16 || Mr. K Ramamoothy || 15 September 1980 || 28 February 1992
|-
| 17 || Mr. P V Bhatt || 1 March 1992 || 1 May 1993
|-
| 18 || Mr. R Basu || 2 May 1983 || 21 April 1986
|-
| 19 || Mr. N M Bijlani || 22 April 1986 || 6 March 1989
|-
| 20 || Mr. K Ramamoothy || 7 March 1989 || 10 September 1989
|-
| 21 || Mr. P Basu || 11 September 1989 || 8 April 1992
|-
| 22 || Mr. P K Ghosh || 9 April 1992 || 31 October 1994
|-
| 23 || Mr. K S Verma || 1 November 1994 || 27 September 1997
|-
| 24 || Mr. B K Sinha || 27 September 1997 || 24 June 1999
|-
| 25 || Mr. K Kailashnathan || 24 June 1999 || 18 October 2001
|-
| 26 || Mr. P Panneervel || 18 October 2001 || 7 May 2003
|-
| 27 || Mr. R K Tripathy || 7 May 2003 || 27 January 2005
|-
| 28 || Mr. Anil Mukim || 27 January 2005 || 19 June 2006
|-
| 29 || Mr. I P Gautam || 19 June 2006 || 12 July 2011
|-
| 30 || Mr. (Dr.) Guruprasad Mohapatra || 12 July 2011 || 9 October 2014
|-
| 31 || Ms. D Thara|D Thara || 9 October 2014 || 24 June 2016
|-
| 32 || Mr. Mukesh Kumar
| 24 June 2016 || 15 July 2018
|-
|33  ||Mr. Vijay Nehra
| 16 July 2018 || 17 May 2020
|-
|34  ||Mr. Mukesh Kumar
| 17 May 2020 || 28 December 2021
|-
|35  ||Mr. Lochan Sehra
| 29 December 2021 || Till Date

Government of Ahmedabad
1873 establishments in India
Municipal Commissioners of India
Local government-related lists